Inácio Montanha  ( 25 July 1858 in Jaguarão — 1933 in Porto Alegre) was a Brazilian educator. 

He studied at the Episcopal Seminary of Porto Alegre, graduating as a professor in 1879, gaining renowned as one of the main masters of the city. He taught Portuguese, Mathematics, History and Geography. In view of his reputation it was invited teaching in the Seminarand in 1890 it established and started to direct the Brazilian School, which likewise became one of most given prestige, been considered a school-model and frequented by the elite. Over his classes they passed figures that then became eminent, like Nicolau de Araújo Switch, Walter Jobim, Getúlio Vargas and Ildo Meneghetti. They were reserved a third of the waves to poor pupils whom they could not deal with the studies. After leaving the direction, it was dedicated to the charity, serving still like ex-pupils' counsellor. The acting of Mountain cost him a prestige that exceeded widely the state frontiers, at a moment of general renovation of the educative practices, and it marked the cultural scenery of the state in the passage in the 19th and 20th century

The Brazilian School was expropriated by the state government and it continues in activity re-baptized with his name in 1938 and from 1943 in more spacious installations.

References 

People from Jaguarão
Brazilian educators
1933 deaths
1858 births